Christopher Priest may refer to:

Christopher Priest (novelist) (born 1943), British novelist
Christopher Priest (comics) (born 1961), American writer of comic books also known as Jim Owsley
Chris Priest (footballer) (born 1973), former English midfielder

See also
Priest (disambiguation)